Hispanic and Latino Floridians are residents of the state of Florida who are of Hispanic or Latino ancestry. As of the 2020 US Census, Latinos of any race were 26.2% of the state's population. Latinos in Florida accounted for 5.3 million (8 percent) of the US Latino population. At around 28.5% of the population as of 2017, Cubans are the largest Latino group in Florida. Puerto Ricans are one of the fastest growing Latino groups in Florida, with one out of every five Latinos in the state being of Puerto Rican origin. Cubans and Puerto Ricans together make up almost half of Florida's Latino population. Other sizable Latino groups include South Americans (17.9%), Mexicans (13.5%), Central Americans (10.7%), and Dominicans (4.8%); all other Latinos make up 3.6% in total.

Demographics
According to the Pew Research Center the Latino population of Florida breaks down as follows as of 2011:

Race
12% of all Afro-Latinos in the United States live in the state of Florida. The only states with a larger share of the national Afro-Latino population are California (15%) and New York (23%).

LGBT community
30% of all LGBT people in the state of Florida are Latinos.

Cubans in Florida 
Florida boasts the highest population of Cubans in the United States, which is due primarily to the relatively close proximity of Florida to Cuba as well as several political incidents which drove citizens of Cuba to migrate. Since the induction of Fidel Castro as dictator of Cuba in 1959, there have been several distinct waves of immigration from Cuba to Florida. The first of these waves coincided with the rise of Castro, who was a very polarizing figure in the eyes of the Cuban people. Castro's extreme politics led many supporters of the previous government to leave Cuba behind in the wake of the revolution. The mass exodus from Cuba in the 60's on account of Castro's takeover resulted in a growth of 360,000 Cubans from 1960 to 1970, according to the Digital Public Library of America. The second wave was also due to Castro's rule, and occurred after the shutdown of approximately 55,000 business in 1968. In the time between 1968 and 1974, another 250,000 Cubans left their home country for the US, most of them coming to Florida. Wave three was again a consequence of Fidel Castro, who in 1980 removed a security detail from the Peruvian embassy due to a conflict which left two guards wounded. The removal of this security detail caused hundreds of Cubans to swarm the embassy in hopes of leaving Cuba. In response to this, Castro opened up the port of El Mariel, and between the months of April and September 1980 125,000 Cubans left for Florida. Most of the Cubans in Florida reside in Miami.

See also

Cuban migration to Miami
Floridanos

References

External links